America's Test Kitchen (originally America's Test Kitchen from Cook's Illustrated Magazine) is a half-hour long cooking show broadcast by PBS and Create. Originally hosted by Christopher Kimball, the program currently is co-hosted by Julia Collin Davison and Bridget Lancaster.

On the show, a handful of test cooks are filmed in a real, working test kitchen, including hosts Davison and Lancaster and chefs Keith Dresser, Becky Hays, Lan Lam, Erin McMurrer, Elle Simone Scott, and Dan Souza. Also, Bryan Roof, Christie Morrison, Ashley Moore, Lawman Johnson, and Morgan Bolling
prepare recipes as they discuss what works, what doesn't, and why, highlighting the rigorous recipe testing process at the core of the test kitchen's mission. Equipment expert Adam Ried, gadget critic Lisa McManus, and tasting expert Jack Bishop help viewers understand what to look for when buying gear and ingredients.

The show is affiliated with America's Test Kitchen, publishers of Cook's Illustrated and Cook's Country magazines, and beginning in Season 19, the show is recorded at ATK's test kitchen facility at the Innovation and Design Building in Boston, Massachusetts.

Episode format
A typical episode of the show consists primarily of two or three recipes that are consistent with the theme of the episode. Each recipe is tested 40-60 times before appearing on the show or in the books, at an average cost of $10,000; they also have a network of 35,000 people who have volunteered to test them. For broadcast, each recipe is presented by a test cook to one of the hosts, Julia Collin Davison or Bridget Lancaster, who walk through recipe steps, explain common problems that can occur when cooking it, and explain how to cook it the right way by sharing discoveries made during the testing and the science behind the recipe using instructional graphics. Periodically throughout the episode, other segments are inserted, usually consisting of two or more of the following:

 An Equipment-Testing segment, where Adam Ried reviews kitchen equipment and explains the best product to buy.
 A Tasting Lab segment, where an ingredient or several representative supermarket brands of a prepared food product is run through expert and audience tasting panels and taste-tested by one of the hosts
 A Science Desk segment, discussing the science behind a pertinent technique used in the recipe
 A Quick Tips segment, demonstrating tips and tricks from Cook's Illustrated magazine and viewers' emails and letters
 A Gadget Expert segment, where Lisa McManus reviews and ranks smaller kitchen gadgets

Through season 6 the show was taped in standard definition, 4:3 video; season 7 saw the show switch to widescreen 16:9 video. The high definition version of the show is broadcast as part of PBS HD's master digital schedule, and by some PBS affiliates as part of their normal schedules.

During recording, 26 episodes are videotaped during a three-week period. Six recipes are recorded per day, and there are two recipes demonstrated per episode.

Cast
America's Test Kitchen features several recurring cast members, although not every cast member appears in each episode.

Julia Collin Davison (identified on-screen before season 7 as "Julia Collin"), Bridget Lancaster, Kay Rentschler, Rebecca "Becky" Hays, Sandra Wu, Yvonne Ruperti, J. Kenji Alt (now J. Kenji Lopez-Alt), Erika Bruce, Bryan Roof and Dan Souza are the chefs who explain and prepare the recipes in each episode as Kimball watches and comments.

Yvonne Ruperti and J. Kenji Lopez-Alt departed the company in 2009 and 2011 respectively; Christopher Kimball, ATK co-founder, editor and publisher, who appeared from the show's inception through 2016, parted ways with the company and the show in the fall of that year over a contract dispute.

Usually only one or two of the chefs will appear in an episode. Collin Davison, Lancaster and Rentschler appeared as regular cast members on season 1. Since, Rentschler moved to the positions of Culinary Producer and Executive Chef by season 2 and appeared in only one episode that season, before leaving the show by Season 3. Hays joined the permanent cast in season 5, Bruce, Wu, and Ruperti each appear for a single season (seasons 5, 6, and 8, respectively), and Alt appears in seasons 7 and 8. All are prominent recipe testers or editors in Cook's Illustrated.

Beginning in season 5, Cook's Illustrated staff chefs Hays, Bruce, Jeremy Sauer, and Matthew Card appeared in segments answering common viewer mail questions. Hays, Bruce, and Sauer joined the on-camera cast for season 6; Hays moved into credited cast member status beginning in season 7. Roof and Souza were added to the regular cast starting season 15.

 Christopher Kimball, the show's host for seasons 1–16, was the co-founder, editor and publisher of America's Test Kitchen and its associated magazine, book, television and radio programs from their inception through 2016. Kimball and ATK parted company in the fall of 2016 over a contract dispute.
 Julia Collin Davison, executive food editor for the cookbook division, took over as co-host of America's Test Kitchen alongside Bridget Lancaster with the start of season 17 in January 2017 and took over Kimball's role in introducing the recipes featured in each episode. Collin Davison appeared in most episodes of ATK seasons 1–16, but was to appear in all upcoming episodes thereafter. Collin Davison continues cooking selected recipes on each episode with the help of others.
 Bridget Lancaster, executive food editor for television, radio and new media, appeared as a regular cast member in seasons 1–16 and joins Julia Collin Davison as host in all episodes beginning in season 17. Lancaster will also continue to cook through select recipes on upcoming episodes alongside other cast members. 
 Jack Bishop, Chief Creative Officer for ATK, appears in most episodes hosting the Tasting Lab segment. In the Tasting Lab, he describes a tasting panel's opinions on different brands of the food or ingredient in question, as Kimball, Lancaster or Davison tastes several of the items blind. After Kimball, Lancaster or Collin Davison provides his or her thoughts on the different varieties, Bishop reveals the brands that Kimball, Lancaster or Collin Davison tasted and compares his or her thoughts to those of the tasting panel. Bishop and Kimball frequently refer to a running joke that Kimball's tastes are often vastly different from the tasting panel's; as an example, in a segment tasting bottled waters, Kimball picked Boston tap water over all the brands of bottled water. Bishop also hosts the Cook's Illustrated podcast.
 Dan Souza is editor-in-chief of Cook's Illustrated magazine.
 Adam Ried appears in most episodes as the host of the Equipment Corner segment. In his segment, he shows several brands of a piece of kitchen equipment and often asks Kimball, Lancaster or Collin Davison to use several of the items or eat food prepared with different brands. In the end, he identifies the test kitchen's preferred brand and demonstrates its key features. For particularly expensive items, he often identifies a best buy: an item that was ranked highly but is significantly less expensive than the top brand. Throughout the show's run, items previously tested in other seasons have been retested as technology changes warrant; for instance, in season 8, garlic presses were retested due to the failure of the non-stick coating on the previous winning brand after heavy usage, and a new favorite brand was chosen. Occasionally the Equipment Corner segment does not focus on a single piece of equipment; instead, a "buy it/don't buy it" format is used to pick the best items among newer, trendier kitchen gadgets. One of Ried's favorite "buy it" gadgets was a timer that came with its own lanyard so cooks could wear it around their necks and not have to be in visual range of the oven timer; Ried revealed, however, that the timer was normally used to stay one step ahead of local traffic law enforcers by signaling that it was time to feed the meter or move the car.
 Lisa McManus first appeared as the show's gadget expert in season 10, reviewing smaller kitchen gadgets in short segments. She is executive editor on the ATK Reviews team, which conducts equipment testing and ingredient tasting reviews at America's Test Kitchen. 
 John "Doc" Willoughby hosted the Science Desk segment in the show's first two seasons but was gradually phased out during season 3. After he became executive editor of Gourmet magazine, there was no Science Desk segment for two seasons. Willoughby returned to America's Test Kitchen in 2010, though he left again.
 Odd Todd (Todd Rosenberg) designs animations for the Science Desk segment, illustrating such concepts as flambé, brining, marinating vs. dry spice rubs, and whether plastic or wooden cutting boards are better for overall kitchen hygiene. His segments made their debut in season 5 but were replaced by non-animated segments with Jeremy Sauer in season 6. The animations returned for season 7, interspersed with non-animated science segments done by Kimball and Sauer.
 Guy Crosby is the science adviser for America's Test Kitchen. He began working for Cook's Illustrated as a consulting editor in early 2005.
 Rebecca "Becky" Hays, Dan Souza, Keith Dresser, Elle Simone, Erin McMurrer and Lan Lam are the chefs who explain and prepare the recipes in each episode as the host watches and comments. Usually only one or two of the chefs will appear in an episode. Collin Davison, Lancaster and Rentschler appeared as regular cast members on season 1. Since, Rentschler moved to the positions of Culinary Producer and Executive Chef by season 2 and appeared in only one episode that season, before leaving the show by Season 3. Hays joined the permanent cast in season 5, Bruce, Wu, and Ruperti each appear for a single season (seasons 5, 6, and 8, respectively), and Alt appears in seasons 7 and 8. All are prominent recipe testers or editors in Cook's Illustrated. Beginning in season 5, Cook's Illustrated staff chefs Hays, Bruce, Jeremy Sauer, and Matthew Card appeared in segments answering common viewer mail questions. Hays, Bruce, and Sauer joined the on-camera cast for season 6; Hays moved into credited cast member status beginning in season 7. Souza and Bryan Roof were added to the regular cast starting season 15. Chin, Dresser and Simone were added to the regular cast starting season 17. Also during Season 17, McMurrer and Roof traded places, with McMurrer moving from the cast of sister show Cook's Country to America's Test Kitchen and Roof moving from the America's Test Kitchen cast to Cook's Country. Lan Lam has been added to the cast in season 19 while Tim Chin left the rotation.

Episodes

Other media

Books

Radio shows

Awards

References

External links
 
 
 
 America's Test Kitchen Online Cooking School
 Cook's Illustrated
 Cook's Country
 Cook's Science

PBS original programming
2000s American cooking television series
2001 American television series debuts
2010s American cooking television series